David Allen Dinsmore (born May 25, 1997, in New Albany, Ohio) is an American diver. Dinsmore is now studying at the University of Miami, and dives under coach Randy Ableman. In March 2017, Dinsmore won the NCAA Division I title on the men's platform event with a score of 528.20. He placed 3rd at the 2016 Olympic Diving Trials, behind Steele Johnson and David Boudia respectively.

In 2017, Dinsmore and his partner Krysta Palmer won a bronze medal in the team event at the World Aquatics Championships with a total of 395.90 points.

References

American male divers
Miami Hurricanes men's divers
Sportspeople from Ohio
People from New Albany, Ohio
1997 births
Living people
World Aquatics Championships medalists in diving
Universiade medalists in diving
Universiade silver medalists for the United States
Medalists at the 2017 Summer Universiade